The WotWots is a New Zealand children's television show which debuted in 2005 and has since aired in several other countries worldwide. Created by Martin Baynton and Richard Taylor, the series uses a mix of live-action and computer animation to follow a pair of inquisitive, creative alien siblings as they learn about life on Earth. It currently consists of two series, produced from 2005, and a total of 78 ten-minute episodes. In 2018, spinoff series Kiddets began airing.

Plot 
The show features a pair of tiny, young alien twin siblings who spend their days exploring the environment where their steam-powered spaceship has landed, in an effort both to learn more about Earth fauna and to try to determine what they themselves will grow up to look like. DottyWot, the smart and responsible ship's captain, spends most of her time supervising her more boisterous, fun-loving brother SpottyWot, the ship's engineer and a talented artist. Episodes are set in a zoo, at a farm, or on a beach and most often tie their discovery of an animal characteristic into their own adventures.

Production 
The WotWots was created and developed by children's author Martin Baynton in partnership with filmmaker Richard Taylor, who had previously collaborated on the TV series adaptation of Baynton's book Jane and the Dragon. WotWots is produced by Pūkeko Pictures, a production company founded by Baynton, Taylor, and Tania Rodger. Baynton's son Theo is the series' director, and his daughter Terri is one of the writers.

The puppet-like WotWots characters are computer-animated over live-action footage by the Weta Workshop, the visual effects company founded by Taylor and Rodger, well known for its work on the Lord of the Rings film trilogy. Episodes are filmed on location at Auckland Zoo, Wellington Zoo and Melbourne Zoo, as well as undisclosed beach and farm regions.

Since the WotWots' language consists almost entirely of the syllables "wot" and "wotty", co-creator Martin Baynton also acts as an interactive narrator for the series, serving as a translator both for the aliens' efforts to understand Earth and the human viewership trying to understand them. In the UK, the narrator is played by Nicholas Parsons, and in Poland by Vladimir Press. Baynton also provides the voice for SpottyWot, while South African actress Nathalie Boltt voices DottyWot. Janet Roddick voices the WotWots' computer; she is replaced by Fiona Lewis in the UK version.

Partnership with the NZ Ministry of Health
In August 2011, it was announced by New Zealand's Minister of Health, Tony Ryall, that the WotWots would serve as ambassadors for B4 School Checks, an initiative offering a comprehensive assessment of four-year-old children's health and development.

Episodes

Series One (2009)

Series Two (2011)

Broadcast details

In addition, selected episodes from the show's first season are currently available on Netflix in the United States and episodes can be seen online on Pluto TV's Kids TV channel(ch. 989).

Merchandise
Playskool, a toy brand of Hasbro, is licensed to produce the WotWots toy range, and the toys were launched on 2 September 2009.

In 2011-06-11, the intellectual property and outbound licensing division of American Greetings Corporation announced it has acquired the licensing and merchandising rights to the WotWots. As part of the agreement with production company Pūkeko Pictures, American Greetings Properties has signed on to represent the WotWots brand worldwide.

References

External links 
 
 "The WotWots" announced on Weta Workshop's website
 
 

New Zealand children's animated comedy television series
Animated preschool education television series
2000s preschool education television series
2010s preschool education television series
2000s animated television series
2010s animated television series
Television series with live action and animation
2009 New Zealand television series debuts
2011 New Zealand television series endings
TVNZ 2 original programming
Treehouse TV original programming
Computer-animated television series
English-language television shows
Animated television series about children
Animated television series about extraterrestrial life
Animated television series about siblings